Exo Planet 3 – The Exo'rdium (dot) (stylized as EXO PLANET #3 - The EXO'rDIUM[dot]) is the second live album by South Korean–Chinese boy band Exo. It was released on October 25, 2017 by SM Entertainment and distributed by IRIVER. The album contains 2 CDs and a total of 29 songs.

Track listing

Sales

Release history

References 

2017 live albums
SM Entertainment live albums
Exo albums
Korean-language albums
SM Entertainment albums